The 100th Regiment Pennsylvania Volunteer Infantry ("The Roundheads" and "The Round Head Regiment") was an infantry regiment that served in the Union Army during the American Civil War.

Service
The 100th Pennsylvania Infantry was organized at Pittsburgh, Pennsylvania and mustered in on August 31, 1861, for a three-year enlistment under the command of Colonel Daniel Leasure.

The regiment was attached to Stevens' 2nd Brigade, Sherman's South Carolina Expedition, to April 1862. 2nd Brigade, 2nd Division, Department of the South, to July 1862. 2nd Brigade, 1st Division, IX Corps, Army of the Potomac, to September 1863. 3rd Brigade, 1st Division, IX Corps, to April 1863. 3rd Brigade, 1st Division, IX Corps, Department of the Ohio, to June 1863. Army of the Tennessee, to August 1863, and Army of the Ohio, to March 1864. 2nd Brigade, 1st Division, IX Corps, Army of the Potomac, to June 1864. 1st Brigade, 1st Division, IX Corps, to September 1864. 3rd Brigade, 1st Division, IX Corps, to July 1865.

The 100th Pennsylvania Infantry mustered out July 24, 1865.

Detailed service
The 100th, known as the Round Head Regiment, was recruited in the southwestern part of the state in Aug. 1861, and ordered to Washington on Sep 2, where its organization was completed add it was mustered into the U. S. service for a three years, term. Twelve companies were recruited but one was transferred to the 105th Infantry.  It was next ordered to Fortress Monroe, where it embarked on what proved to be an expedition to Port Royal. Here the fleet arrived Nov 7, and captured Forts Walker and Beauregard. Beaufort was next occupied and the regiment remained in this vicinity for several months, the men suffering very much from sickness. The 100th, participated in the operations against Charleston in June 1862, and lost very heavily in the engagement of June 16, near Secessionville.  Returning to Hilton Head and Beaufort in July, it was ordered to Virginia, later being sent to Fredericksburg and attached to the 9th Corps of the Army of Virginia. After various marches during the month of August, the regiment met the enemy on the Bull Run battlefield, where it saw hard service.  After engaging all day and losing heavily, a final charge was ordered, from which only 198 out of 450 returned unhurt.  It was active at Chantilly and South Mountain, but was held in reserve at Antietam, owing to its crippled condition. It was engaged at Fredericksburg and after the battle performed important duty in covering the withdrawal of the troops, being selected as "The most reliable skirmish regiment in the brigade." In March 1863, it was transferred to the Department of the Ohio and sent to Lexington, Ky., from which place it was ordered in June to the support of Gen. Grant at Vicksburg. It participated in the fighting at Jackson, Miss., after the fall of Vicksburg, and lost many men from sickness as well as from the enemy's fire. On its return north it was ordered to East Tennessee though many of the men were not fit for active service. It participated in an engagement at Blue Springs and in the hardships of the Siege of Knoxville, in spite of which almost the entire regiment reenlisted on January 1, 1864.  At Annapolis, the rendezvous of the 9th Corps, the 100th reported in March and became a part of the 2nd Brigade, 1st Division, attached to the Army of the Potomac. The 9th Corps was closely engaged at the Wilderness, Spotsylvania, the North Anna river and Cold Harbor. Moving to Petersburg, the 100th, was repeatedly in action, notably at the explosion of the mine, the raid on the Weldon Railroad, Poplar Spring Church the Hatcher's run movements, and in the final assault on Petersburg, April 2, 1865. The regiment was mustered out at Washington on July 24, 1865.

Casualties
The regiment lost a total of 409 men during service. Sixteen officers and 208 enlisted men were killed or mortally wounded in combat. Two officers and 183 enlisted men died from disease-related causes.

Commanders
 Colonel Daniel Leasure
 Colonel Norman J. Maxwell
 Lieutenant Colonel David A. Leckey - commanded at the Battle of Antietam
 Lieutenant Colonel Joseph E. Pentecost - commanded at the Battle of the Crater (while still at the rank of captain) after Cpt. Oliver was killed in action; mortally wounded in action at the Battle of Fort Stedman
 Major Thomas J. Hamilton - commanded at the Battle of the Crater where he was mortally wounded in action
 Major Norman J. Maxwell - commanded at the Battle of Fort Stedman after Ltc. Pentecost was mortally wounded in action
 Captain James E. Cornelius - commanded at the Second Battle of Bull Run after Col. Leasure was wounded in action
 Captain Walter Oliver - commanded at the Battle of the Crater after Maj. Hamilton was mortally wounded in action; killed in action there

Notable members
 Private Joseph B. Chambers, Company F - Medal of Honor recipient for action at the Battle of Fort Stedman

See also

 List of Pennsylvania Civil War Units
 Pennsylvania in the Civil War

References
 Bates, Samuel P. and Horace B. Durant. A Brief History of the One Hundredth Regiment (Roundheads,) (New Castle, PA: Jas. C. Stevenson), 1884.
 Dyer, Frederick H. A Compendium of the War of the Rebellion (Des Moines, IA:  Dyer Pub. Co.), 1908.
 Pettit, Frederick. Infantryman Pettit: The Civil War Letters of Corporal Frederick Pettit, Late of Company C, 100th Pennsylvania Veteran Volunteer Infantry Regiment, "The Roundheads," 1862-1864 (Shippensburg, PA: White Mane Pub. Co.), 1990. 
 Schriber, Carolyn Poling. A Scratch With the Rebels: A Pennsylvania Roundhead and a South Carolina Cavalier (Chicora, PA: Mechling Bookbindery), 2007.

References

External links
 Pennsylvania Infantry monument at Antietam Battlefield

Military units and formations established in 1861
Military units and formations disestablished in 1865
Units and formations of the Union Army from Pennsylvania